The Autoroute 13, abbreviated to A13, is a motorway in southern Luxembourg. At Schengen, it reaches the German border, whereupon it meets the A8, which crosses southern Germany.

Overview
For its western 20.4 kilometres, until it reaches Lankelz, it is known as the South collector road.  For its eastern 21.9 kilometres, it is known as the Connection with the Saar, or Saar Autobahn.

In all, the A13 was opened in eight separate sections:
 December 1990: Bascharage - Sanem
 1993: Pétange - Bascharage
 October 1993:  Kayl - Burange
 January 1994: Schifflange - Kayl
 3 June 1994: Sanem - Lankelz
 3 June 1994: Esch-sur-Alzette - Schifflange
 July 1995: Rodange - Pétange
 24 July 2003: Hellange - Schengen

Route

References

External links

  Administration des Ponts et Chaussées - Liaison avec le Sarre
  Administration des Ponts et Chaussées - Collectrice du Sud

Motorways in Luxembourg